Miroslav Milutinović (Serbian Cyrillic: Мирослав Милутиновић; born February 1, 1985) is a Bosnian-Herzegovinian retired football defender.

Club career
He had previously played with lower league clubs FK Cement Beočin and FK ČSK Čelarevo and also with FK Vojvodina in the Serbian SuperLiga.

External links
 Profile and stats at Srbijafudbal

1985 births
Living people
People from Zvornik
Serbs of Bosnia and Herzegovina
Bosnia and Herzegovina emigrants to Serbia
Association football fullbacks
Bosnia and Herzegovina footballers
FK Vojvodina players
FK Cement Beočin players
FK ČSK Čelarevo players
FK Kolubara players
RFK Novi Sad 1921 players
FK Inđija players
FK Hajduk Kula players
Second League of Serbia and Montenegro players
Serbian SuperLiga players
Bosnia and Herzegovina expatriate footballers
Expatriate footballers in Serbia and Montenegro
Bosnia and Herzegovina expatriate sportspeople in Serbia and Montenegro
Expatriate footballers in Serbia
Bosnia and Herzegovina expatriate sportspeople in Serbia